The Enantiornithes, also known as enantiornithines or enantiornitheans in literature, are a group of extinct avialans ("birds" in the broad sense), the most abundant and diverse group known from the Mesozoic era. Almost all retained teeth and clawed fingers on each wing, but otherwise looked much like modern birds externally. Over eighty species of Enantiornithes have been named, but some names represent only single bones, so it is likely that not all are valid. The Enantiornithes became extinct at the Cretaceous–Paleogene boundary, along with Hesperornithes and all other non-avian dinosaurs.

Discovery and naming 
The first Enantiornithes to be discovered were incorrectly referred to modern bird groups. For example, the first known species of Enantiornithes, Gobipteryx minuta, was originally considered a paleognath related to ostriches and tinamou. The Enantiornithes were first recognized as a distinct lineage, or "subclass" of birds, by Cyril A. Walker in 1981. Walker made this discovery based on some partial remains from the late Cretaceous period of what is now Argentina, which he assigned to a new genus, Enantiornis, giving the entire group its name. Since the 1990s, many more complete specimens of Enantiornithes have been discovered, and it was determined that a few previously described "birds" (e.g. Iberomesornis, Cathayornis, and Sinornis) were also Enantiornithes.

The name "Enantiornithes" means "opposite birds", from Ancient Greek enantios "opposite" + ornithes "birds" . The name was coined by Cyril Alexander Walker in his landmark paper which established the group. In his paper, Walker explained what he meant by "opposite":

This refers to an anatomical feature – the articulation of the shoulder bones – which has a concave-convex socket joint between the scapula (shoulder blade) and coracoid (the primary bone of the shoulder girdle in vertebrates other than mammals) that is the reverse of that of modern birds. Specifically, in the Enantiornithes, the scapula is concave and dish-shaped at this joint, and the coracoid is convex. In modern birds, the coracoscapular joint has a concave coracoid and convex scapula.

Walker was not clear on his reasons for giving this name in the etymology section of his paper, and this ambiguity led to some confusion among later researchers. For example, Alan Feduccia stated in 1996:

Feduccia's point about the tarsometatarsus (the combined upper foot and ankle bone) is correct, but Walker did not use this reasoning in his original paper. Walker never described the fusion of the tarsometatarsus as opposite, but rather as "Only partial". Also, it is not certain that Enantiornithes had triosseal canals, since no fossil preserves this feature.

As a group, the Enantiornithes are often referred to as "enantiornithines" in literature. However, several scientists have noted that this is incorrect, because following the standard rules for forming the names of animal groups, it implies reference only to the subfamily Enantiornithinae. Following the naming conventions used for modern birds as well as extinct groups, it has been pointed out that the correct term is "enantiornithean".

Origin and range
Enantiornithine-like birds found in Albian of Australia, Maastrichtian of South America, and Campanian of Mexico (Alexornis), Mongolia and western edge of prehistoric Asia suggest a worldwide distribution of this group or in the relatively warm regions, at least. Enantiornithes have been found on every continent except Antarctica. Fossils attributable to this group are exclusively Cretaceous in age, and it is believed that the Enantiornithes became extinct at the same time as their non-avialan dinosaur relatives. The earliest known Enantiornithes are from the Early Cretaceous of Spain (e.g. Noguerornis) and China (e.g. Protopteryx) and the latest from the Late Cretaceous of North and South America (e.g. Avisaurus and Enantiornis). The widespread occurrence of this group suggests that at least some Enantiornithes were able to cross oceans under their own power; they are the first known avialan lineage with a global distribution.

Description

Many fossils of Enantiornithes are very fragmentary, and some species are only known from a piece of a single bone. Almost all specimens that are complete, in full articulation, and with soft tissue preservation are known from Las Hoyas in Cuenca, Spain and the Jehol group in Liaoning (China). Extraordinary remains of Enantiornithes have also been preserved in Burmese amber deposits dated to 99 million years ago and include hatchlings described in 2017 and 2018, as well as isolated body parts such as wings and feet. These amber remains are among the most well-preserved of any mesozoic dinosaur. Fossils of this clade have been found in both inland and marine sediments, suggesting that they were an ecologically diverse group.

Enantiornithes appear to have included waders, swimmers, granivores, insectivores, fishers, and raptors. The vast majority of Enantiornithes were small, between the size of a sparrow and a starling, however display considerable variation in size with some species. The largest species in this clade include Pengornis houi, Xiangornis shenmi, Zhouornis hani, and Mirarce eatoni, (with the latter species being described as similar in size to modern turkeys,) although at least a few larger species may have also existed, including a potentially crane-sized species known only from footprints in the Eumeralla Formation (and possibly also represented in the Wonthaggi Formation by a single furcula). Among the smallest described specimens are unnamed hatchlings, although the holotype specimens of Parvavis chuxiongensis and Cratoavis cearensis are comparable in size to small tits or hummingbirds.

Skull

Given their wide range of habitats and diets, the skulls of Enantiornithes varied considerably between species. Skulls of Enantiornithes combined a unique suite of primitive and advanced features. As in more primitive avialans like Archaeopteryx, they retained several separate cranial bones, small premaxillae (bones of the snout tip) and most species had toothy jaws rather than toothless beaks. Only a few species, such as Gobipteryx minuta, were fully toothless and had beaks. They also had simple quadrate bones, a complete bar separating each orbit (eye hole) from each antorbital fenestra, and dentaries (the main toothed bones of the lower jaw) without forked rear tips. A squamosal bone is preserved in an indeterminate juvenile specimen, while a postorbital is preserved in Shenqiornis and Pengornis. In modern birds these bones are assimilated into the cranium. Some Enantiornithes may have had their temporal fenestrae (holes in the side of the head) merged into the orbits as in modern birds due to the postorbitals either not being present or not being long enough to divide the openings. A quadratojugal bone, which in modern birds is fused to the jugal, is preserved in Pterygornis. The presence of these primitive features of the skull would have rendered the Enantiornithes capable of only limited cranial kinesis (the ability to move the jaw independent of the cranium).

Wing

As a very large group of birds, the Enantiornithes displayed a high diversity of different body plans based on differences in ecology and feeding, reflected in an equal diversity of wing forms, many paralleling adaptions to different lifestyles seen in modern birds. In general, the wings of Enantiornithes were advanced compared to more primitive avialans like Archaeopteryx, and displayed some features related to flight similar to those found in the lineage leading to modern birds, the Ornithuromorpha. While most Enantiornithes had claws on at least some of their fingers, many species had shortened hands, a highly mobile shoulder joint, and proportional changes in the wing bones similar to modern birds. Like modern birds, Enantiornithes had alulas, or "bastard wings", small forward-pointing arrangements of feathers on the first digit that granted higher maneuverability in the air and aided in precise landings.

Several wings with preserved feathers have been found in Burmese amber. These are the first complete Mesozoic dinosaur remains preserved this way (a few isolated feathers are otherwise known, unassigned to any species), and one of the most exquisitely preserved dinosaurian fossils known. The preserved wings show variations in feather pigment and prove that Enantiornithes had fully modern feathers, including barbs, barbules, and hooklets, and a modern arrangement of wing feather including long flight feathers, short coverts, a large alula and an undercoat of down.

One fossil of Enantiornithes shows wing-like feather tufts on its legs, similar to Archaeopteryx. The leg feathers are also reminiscent of the four-winged dinosaur Microraptor, however differ by the feathers being shorter, more disorganized (they do not clearly form a wing) and only extend down to the ankle rather than along the foot.

Tail

Clarke et al. (2006) surveyed all fossils of Enantiornithes then known and concluded that none had preserved tail feathers that formed a lift-generating fan, as in modern birds. They found that all avialans outside of Euornithes (the clade they referred to as Ornithurae) with preserved tail feathers had only short coverts or elongated paired tail plumes. They suggested that the development of the pygostyle in Enantiornithes must have been a function of tail shortening, not the development of a modern tail feather anatomy. These scientists suggested that a fan of tail feathers and the associated musculature needed to control them, known as the rectrical bulb, evolved alongside a short, triangular pygostyle, like the ones in modern birds, rather than the long, rod- or dagger-shaped pygostyles in more primitive avialans like the Enantiornithes. Instead of a feather fan, most Enantiornithes had a pair of long specialized pinfeathers similar to those of the extinct Confuciusornis and certain extant birds-of-paradise.

However, further discoveries showed that at least among basal Enantiornithes, tail anatomy was more complex than previously thought. One genus, Shanweiniao, was initially interpreted as having at least four long tail feathers that overlapped each other and might have formed a lift-generating surface similar to the tail fans of Euronithes, though a later study indicates that Shanweiniao was more likely to have rachis-dominated tail feathers similar to feathers present in Paraprotopteryx. Chiappeavis, a primitive pengornithid, had a fan of tail feathers similar to that of more primitive avialans like Sapeornis, suggesting that this might have been the ancestral condition, with pinfeathers being a feature evolved several times in early avialans for display purposes. Another species of Enantiornithes, Feitianius, also had an elaborate fan of tail feathers. More importantly, soft tissue preserved around the tail was interpreted as the remains of a rectrical bulb, suggesting that this feature was not in fact restricted to species with modern-looking pygostyles, but might have evolved much earlier than previously thought and been present in many Enantiornithes. At least one genus of Enantiornithes, Cruralispennia, had a modern-looking pygostyle but lacked a tail fan.

Biology

Diet
Given the wide diversity of skull shape among Enantiornithes, many different dietary specializations must have been present among the group. Some, like Shenqiornis, had large, robust jaws suitable for eating hard-shelled invertebrates. The short, blunt teeth of Pengornis were likely used to feed on soft-bodied arthropods. The strongly hooked talons of Bohaiornithidae suggest that they were predators of small to medium-sized vertebrates, but their robust teeth instead suggest a diet of hard-shelled animals.

A few specimens preserve actual stomach contents. Unfortunately, none of these preserve the skull, so direct correlation between their known diet and snout/tooth shape cannot be made. Eoalulavis was found to have the remains of exoskeletons from aquatic crustaceans preserved in its digestive tract, and Enantiophoenix preserved corpuscles of amber among the fossilized bones, suggesting that this animal fed on tree sap, much like modern sapsuckers and other birds. The sap would have fossilized and become amber. However, more recently it has been suggested that the sap moved post-mortem, hence not representing true stomachal contents. Combined with the putative fish pellets of Piscivorenantiornis turning out to be fish excrement, the strange stomachal contents of some species turning out to be ovaries and the supposed gastroliths of Bohaiornis being random mineral precipitates, only the Eoalulavis displays actual stomach contents.

A study on paravian digestive systems indicates that known Enantiornithes lacked a crop and a gizzard, didn't use gastroliths and didn't eject pellets. This is considered at odds with the high diversity of diets that their different teeth and skull shapes imply, though some modern birds have lost the gizzard and rely solely on strong stomachal acids.  An example was discovered with what was suspected to be gastroliths in the what would have been the fossil's stomach, re-opening the discussion of the use of gastroliths by Enantiornithes.  X-ray and scanning microscope inspection of the rocks determined that they were actually chalcedony crystals, and not gastroliths.

Longipterygidae is the most extensively studied family in terms of diet due to their rather unusual resotral anatomy, with long jaws and few teeth arranged at the jaw ends. They have variously been interpreted as piscivores, probers akin to shorebirds and as arboreal bark-probers. A 2022 study however does find them most likely to be generalistic insectivores (sans possibly Shengjingornis due to its larger size, poorly preserved skull and unusual pedal anatomy), being too small for specialised carnivory and herbivory; the atypical rostrum is tentatively speculated to be unrelated to feeding ecology.

Predation
A fossil from Spain reported by Sanz et al. in 2001 included the remains of four hatchling skeletons of three different species of Enantiornithes. They are substantially complete, very tightly associated, and show surface pitting of the bones that indicates partial digestion. The authors concluded that this association was a regurgitated pellet and, from the details of the digestion and the size, that the hatchlings were swallowed whole by a pterosaur or small theropod dinosaur. This was the first evidence that Mesozoic avialans were prey animals, and that some Mesozoic pan-avians regurgitated pellets like owls do today.

Life history

Known fossils of Enantiornithes include eggs, embryos, and hatchlings. An embryo, still curled in its egg, has been reported from the Yixian Formation. Juvenile specimens can be identified by a combination of factors: rough texture of their bone tips indicating portions which were still made of cartilage at the time of death, relatively small breastbones, large skulls and eyes, and bones which had not yet fused to one another. Some hatchling specimens have been given formal names, including "Liaoxiornis delicatus"; however, Luis Chiappe and colleagues considered the practice of naming new species based on juveniles detrimental to the study of Enantiornithes, because it is nearly impossible to determine which adult species a given juvenile specimen belongs to, making any species with a hatchling holotype a nomen dubium.

Together with hatchling specimens of the Mongolian Gobipteryx and Gobipipus, these finds demonstrate that hatchling Enantiornithes had the skeletal ossification, well-developed wing feathers, and large brain which correlate with precocial or superprecocial patterns of development in birds of today. In other words, Enantiornithes probably hatched from the egg already well developed and ready to run, forage, and possibly even fly at just a few days old.

Analyses of Enantiornithes bone histology have been conducted to determine the growth rates of these animals. A 2006 study of Concornis bones showed a growth pattern different from modern birds; although growth was rapid for a few weeks after hatching, probably until fledging, this small species did not reach adult size for a long time, probably several years. Other studies have all supported the view that growth to adult size was slow, as it is in living precocial birds (as opposed to altricial birds, which are known to reach adult size quickly). Studies of the rate of bone growth in a variety of Enantiornithes has shown that smaller species tended to grow faster than larger ones, the opposite of the pattern seen in more primitive species like Jeholornis and in non-avialan dinosaurs. Some analyses have interpreted the bone histology to indicate that Enantiornithes may not have had fully avian endothermy, instead having an intermediate metabolic rate. However a 2021 study rejects the idea that they had less endothermic metabolisms than modern birds.

Evidence of colonial nesting has been found in Enantiornithes, in sediments from the Late Cretaceous (Maastrichtian) of Romania. Evidence from nesting sites shows that Enantiornithes buried their eggs like modern megapodes, which is consistent with their inferred superprecocial adaptations.

A 2020 study on a juvenile's feathers further stresses the ontological similarities to modern megapodes, but cautions several differences such as the arboreal nature of most Enantiornithes as opposed to the terrestrial lifestyle of megapodes.

It has been speculated that superprecociality in Enantiornithes might have prevented them from developing specialised toe arrangements seen in modern birds like zygodactyly.

Although the vast majority of histology studies and known remains of Enantiornithes point to supreprecociality being the norm, one specimen, MPCM-LH-26189, seems to represent an altricial juvenile, implying that like modern birds Enantiornithes explored multiple reproductive strategies.

Flight
Because many Enantiornithes lacked complex tails and possessed radically different wing anatomy compared to modern birds, they have been the subject of several studies testing their flight capabilities.

Traditionally, they have been considered inferior flyers, due to the shoulder girdle anatomy being assumed to be more primitive and unable to support a ground-based launching mechanism, as well as due to the absence of rectrices in many species.

However, several studies have shown that they were efficient flyers, like modern birds, possessing a similarly complex nervous system and wing feather ligaments. Additionally, the lack of a complex tail appears to not have been very relevant for avian flight as a whole - some extinct birds like lithornids also lacked complex tail feathers but were good flyers, and they appear to have been capable of a ground based launching.

Due to the difference in sternal and shoulder girdle anatomy, many Enantiornithes used a flight style unlike that of any modern bird species, though more typical flight styles were present as well.

At least Elsornis appears to have become secondarily flightless.

Classification
Some researchers classify Enantiornithes, along with the true birds, in the class Aves. Others use the more restrictive crown group definition of Aves (which only includes neornithes, anatomically modern birds), and place Enantiornithes in the more inclusive group Avialae. Enantiornithes were more advanced than Archaeopteryx, Confuciusornis, and Sapeornis, but in several respects they were more primitive than modern birds, perhaps following an intermediate evolutionary path.

A consensus of scientific analyses indicates that Enantiornithes is one of two major groups within the larger group Ornithothoraces. The other ornithothoracine group is Euornithes or Ornithuromorpha, which includes all living birds as a subset. This means that Enantiornithes were a successful branch of avialan evolution, but one that diversified entirely separately from the lineage leading to modern birds. One study has however found that the shared sternal anatomy was acquired independently and such a relationship needs to be reexamined.

Enantiornithes classification and taxonomy has historically been complicated by a number of factors. In 2010, paleontologists Jingmai O'Connor and Gareth Dyke outlined a number of criticisms against the prevailing practices of scientists failing to describe many specimens in enough detail for others to evaluate thoroughly. Some species have been described based on specimens which are held in private collections, making further study or review of previous findings impossible. Because it is often unfeasible for other scientists to study each specimen in person given the worldwide distribution of the Enantiornithes, and due to the many uninformative descriptions which have been published on possibly important specimens, many of these specimens become "functional nomina dubia". Furthermore, many species have been named based on extremely fragmentary specimens, which would not be very informative scientifically even if they were described sufficiently. Over one-third of all named species are based on only a fragment of a single bone. O'Connor and Dyke argued that while these specimens can help expand knowledge of the time span or geographic range of the Enantiornithes and it is important to describe them, naming such specimens is "unjustifiable".

Relationships
Enantiornithes is the sister group to Euornithes, and together they form a clade called Ornithothoraces (though see above). Most phylogenetic studies have recovered Enantiornithes as a monophyletic group distinct from the modern birds and their closest relatives. The 2002 phylogenetic analysis by Clarke and Norell, though, reduced the number of Enantiornithes autapomorphies to just four.

Enantiornithes systematics are highly provisional and notoriously difficult to study, due to the fact that Enantiornithes tend to be extremely homoplastic, or very similar to each other in most of their skeletal features due to convergent evolution rather than common ancestry. What appears fairly certain by now is that there were subdivisions within Enantiornithes possibly including some minor basal lineages in addition to the more advanced Euenantiornithes. The details of the interrelationship of all these lineages, indeed the validity of most, is disputed, although the Avisauridae, for one example, seem likely to constitute a valid group. Phylogenetic taxonomists have hitherto been very reluctant to suggest delimitations of enantiornithine clades.

One such delineation named the Euenantiornithes, was defined by Chiappe (2002) as comprising all species closer to Sinornis than to Iberomesornis. Because Iberomesornis is often found to be the most primitive or basal enantiornithine,  Euenantiornithes may be an extremely inclusive group, made up of all Enantiornithes except for Iberomesornis itself. Despite being in accordance with phylogenetic nomenclature, this definition of Euenantiornithes was severely criticized by some researchers, such as Paul Sereno, who called it "a ill-defined clade [...] a good example of a poor choice in a phylogenetic definition".

The cladogram below was found by an analysis by Wang et al. in 2015, updated from a previous data set created by Jingmai O'Connor.

The cladogram below is from Wang et al., 2022, and includes most named taxa and recovers several previously-named clades. Letters on branches indicate the positions of "wildcard" taxa, those which have been recovered in multiple disparate positions.

Key to letters:

b = Boluochia
c = Cathayornis
e = Enantiophoenix
f = Houornis
h = Longipteryx
i = Parabohaiornis
j = Pterygornis
l = Vorona
m = Yuanjiawaornis
n = Yungavolucris

List of genera

Incertae sedis 
Enantiornithes taxonomy is difficult to evaluate, and as a result few clades within the group are consistently found by phylogenetic analyses. Most Enantiornithes are not included in any specific family, and as such are listed here. Many of these have been considered Euenantiornithes, although the controversy behind this name means that it is not used consistently in studies of Enantiornithes.

Longipterygidae
The Longipterygidae was a family of long-snouted early Cretaceous Enantiornithes, with teeth only at the tips of the snout. They are generally considered to be fairly basal members of the group.

Pengornithidae
The Pengornithidae was a family of large early Enantiornithes. They had numerous small teeth and numerous primitive features which are lost in most other Enantiornithes. Mostly known from the early Cretaceous of China, with putative Late Cretaceous taxa from Madagascar.

Bohaiornithidae
Bohaiornithids were large but geologically short-lived early Enantiornithes, with long, hooked talons and robust teeth with curved tips. They may have been equivalent to birds of prey, although this interpretation is open to much debate. The monophyly of this group is doubtful, and it may actually be an evolutionary grade.

Gobipterygidae
Some members of the group are obscure or poorly described and may be synonymous with its type species, Gobipteryx minuta.

Avisauridae
Avisauridae is subjected to two differing definitions of varying inclusiveness. The more inclusive definition, which follows Cau & Arduini (2008), is used here. Avisaurids were a long-lasting and widespread family of Enantiornithes, which are mainly distinguished by specific features of their tarsometatarsals (ankle bones). The largest and most advanced members of the group survived in North and South America up until the end of the Cretaceous, yet are very fragmentary compared to some earlier taxa.

Dubious genera and notable unnamed specimens
Gobipipus reshetovi: Described in 2013 from embryo specimens within eggshells from the Barun Goyot Formation of Mongolia. These specimens were very similar to embryonic Gobipteryx specimens, although the describers of Gobipipus (a set of controversial paleontologists including Evgeny Kurochkin and Sankar Chatterjee) consider it distinct.
Hebeiornis fengningensis: A synonym of Vescornis due to having been described from the same specimen. Despite having been described in 1999, 5 years prior to the description of Vescornis, the description was so poor compared to the description of Vescornis that the latter name is considered to take priority by most authors. As a result, the name Hebeiornis is considered a nomen nudum ("naked name").
 "Proornis" is an informally-named bird from North Korea. It may not be a member of Enantiornithes.
 Liaoxiornis delicatus: Described in 1999 from a specimen of Enantiornithes found in the Yixian Formation. This specimen was originally considered to be a tiny adult, but later found to be a hatchling. Other specimens have henceforth been assigned to the genus. Due to a lack of distinguishing feature, many paleontologists have considered this genus an undiagnostic nomen dubium.
 "Wasaibpanchi": A supposed member of Enantiornithes from Pakistan; the describing paper is of dubious status.
LP-4450: A juvenile of an indeterminate specimen of Enantiornithes from the El Montsec Formation of Spain. Its 2006 description studied the histology of the skeleton, while later studies reported a squamosal bone present in the specimen but unknown in other Enantiornithes.
IVPP V 13939: Briefly described in 2004, this Yixian Enantiornithes specimen had advanced pennaceous feathers on its legs, similar to (albeit shorter than) those of other paravians such as Microraptor and Anchiornis.
DIP-V-15100 and DIP-V-15101: Two different wings from hatchling specimens which were described in 2015. They attracted a significant amount of media attention upon their description. They were preserved in exceptional details due to having been trapped within Burmese amber for approximately 99 million years.
HPG-15-1: A partial corpse of an Enantiornithes hatchling also preserved in Burmese amber. Although indeterminate, it attracted even more media attention than the two wings upon its description in 2017.
CUGB P1202: An indeterminate juvenile bohaiornithid from the Jiufotang Formation. A 2016 analysis of its feathering found elongated putative melanosomes, suggesting that a large portion of its feathering was iridescent.
DIP-V-15102: Another corpse of an indeterminate hatchling preserved in Burmese amber. Described in early 2018.
MPCM-LH-26189 a/b: A partial skeleton of a hatchling from Las Hoyas in Spain, including both slab and counter-slab components. Its 2018 description revealed how various features developed in Enantiornithes as they aged. Such features include the ossification of the sternum from various smaller bones, and the fusion of tail vertebrae into a pygostyle.

References

External links 

 
Cretaceous birds
Early Cretaceous first appearances
Maastrichtian extinctions